John Wai may refer to:
 John Wai (canoeist), Hong Kong sprint canoeist
 John Young Wai, Australian Chinese community leader